Christopher Bieber (born 3 July 1989) is a German footballer who plays for TSV Aubstadt in the Regionalliga Bayern.

Bieber made his debut for Karlsruher SC on 5 February 2010, in a 2–1 away defeat against St. Pauli, after he came off the bench to replace Lars Stindl on the 82 minute. After two seasons with Karlsruhe's first team, Bieber moved abroad to Dutch FC Oss.

References

External links
 
 Christopher Bieber at VI.nl 

1989 births
Living people
German footballers
Association football forwards
2. Bundesliga players
3. Liga players
Regionalliga players
Hessenliga players
Eerste Divisie players
Karlsruher SC II players
Karlsruher SC players
TOP Oss players
Würzburger Kickers players
FC Rot-Weiß Erfurt players
TSV Aubstadt players
German expatriate footballers
German expatriate sportspeople in the Netherlands
Expatriate footballers in the Netherlands
People from Bad Mergentheim
Sportspeople from Stuttgart (region)
Footballers from Baden-Württemberg